Gurkirtan Chauhan (6 September 1951 - 2 March 2009), also credited as simply Gurkirtan, was an Indian actor who worked in Punjabi and Hindi films. He played various roles in many films such as Taare Zameen Par, Tabaahi, Jatt Jeona Mour, Waris Shah: Ishq Daa Waaris, and Shaheed-E-Mohabbat Boota Singh.

After having obtained a degree in civil engineering from the Chandigarh College of Architecture, he gravitated towards film, initially beginning his acting career in theatre. His first appreciated role was of Dogar, a villain in the hit film Jatt Jeona Mour. 

He married Paramjit Kaur in 1984. Chauhan died due to cardiac arrest on 3 March 2009. He is survived by two children.

Filmography 
 Jatt Jeona Mour (1991) as Choudhary Ahmed Dogar 
 Putt Saradaran De (1992) as Succha 
 Mirza Jatt (1992) as Shameer Khan 
 Baghi Soormay (1993) as Police Officer
 Vairi (1994) as Bandemaar/Bhoonda
 Mera Punjab (1994) as Sujaan Singh
 Ucha Pind (1994) as Zaildaar Dayal Singh
 Dhee Jatt Di (1995) as Shamsher Singh Sarang
 Pratigya (1995) as Laakha
 Zaildaar (1995) as Babbar
 Bagawat (1995) as Editor Chander Mohan (CM)
 Lambardaar (1995) as Jaildaar Jung Singh
 Tabaahi (1996) as Mantri Balwant Singh
 Rab Dian Rakhan (1996) as Ajit 'Bava' Prasad
 Ishq Na Pooche Jaat (1997) as Chaudhary Arjan Singh
 Jung Da Maidan (1997) 
 Sardari (1997) 
 Khoon Da Daaj (1998) as Jaila
 Shaheed-E-Mohabbat Boota Singh (1999) as Boota's Uncle
 Badla... The Revenge (2003) as Bagga
 Des Hoya Pardes (2004) as SHO Amarjeet Singh
 Shaheed Uddham Singh (2004)  (Hindi film)
 Mehndi Wale Hath (2006) as Massa Chichar
 Rabb Ne Banaiyan Jodiean (2006)
 Waris Shah: Ishq Daa Waaris (2004) as Qaazi
 Dil Ki Kare (2006) as Sarpanch (TV film) 
 Kaun Kise Da Beli (2007) as Kewal Kishen
 Taare Zameen Par (2007) as Housemaster (Hindi film)
 Vidroh (2007) as Prataap Singh
 Namastey London (2007) as Father (Hindi film)
 Hashar: A Love Story (2008) as SHO
 Majaajan (2008) as Bachan Singh 
 Akhiyaan Udeekdian (2009) as Rajveer Singh
 Luv U Bobby (2009) as Sherjit
 Dev D (2009) as Satpal Dhillon - Dev's dad (Hindi film)
 Jawani Zindabaad (2009) 
 Sukhmani: Hope for Life (2010)
 Chak Jawana (2010) as Sarpanch Balkar Singh

References

2009 deaths
1951 births
Indian male film actors
Male actors in Punjabi cinema
Place of birth missing